Customer data or consumer data refers to all personal, behavioural, and demographic data that is collected by marketing companies and departments from their customer base.
To some extent, data collection from customers intrudes into customer privacy, the exact limits to the type and amount of data collected need to be regulated. The data collected is processed in customer analytics. The data collection is thus aimed at insights into customer behaviour (buying decisions, etc.) and, eventually, profit maximization by consolidation and expansion of the customer base.

In the internet age, a prominent method for collecting customer data is through explicit online surveys, but also through concealed methods like measurement of click-through and abandonment rates.

Customer data is gathered for customer research, especially customer satisfaction research and purportedly serves to increase overall customer satisfaction.

Levels of information
A possible classification of business customer information was proposed by Minna J. Rollins who distinguished the levels a) market b) organizational c) business unit, and d) individual. For private consumers, different levels are a) personal identifying data b) psychographics data, c) transactional (buying) data, d) demographic, and e) financial data. While the individual data level for business customers has some overlap with the data gathered from individual consumers, the other business-related levels roughly correspond to the demographic part of individual customers.

See also

Audience measurement
Customer data management
Customer data integration
Customer data platform
Customer intelligence
Market research

References

Customer relationship management